The 2006–07 Maltese First Division Knock-Out (known as EuroSport First Division Knock-Out due to sponsorship reasons) was a knockout tournament for Maltese football clubs playing in the First Division. The winners were Tarxien Rainbows and the runner-up were Mosta.

The competition began on 18 November 2006 and ended on 24 May 2007 with the final.

The competition began with the preliminary round. Four teams played in the preliminary round. The two winners from the preliminary round advanced to the quarter-finals with the rest of the teams of the First Division. The four winners of the quarter-finals, which were Mosta, Senglea Athletic, St. Patrick and Tarxien Rainbows advanced to the semi-finals.

Preliminary round

|colspan="3" style="background:#fcc;"|18 November 2006

|}

Quarter-finals

|colspan="3" style="background:#fcc;"|7 April 2007

|-
|colspan="3" style="background:#fcc;"|8 April 2007

|}

Semi-finals

|colspan="3" style="background:#fcc;"|19 May 2007

|}

Final

|colspan="3" style="background:#fcc;"|24 May 2007

|}

See also
 2006–07 Maltese First Division

Maltese First Division knock-out
knock-out